Glenea propinqua is a species of beetle in the family Cerambycidae. It was described by Charles Joseph Gahan in 1897. It is known from Malaysia, Laos, and Singapore.

Subspecies
 Glenea propinqua propinqua Gahan, 1897
 Glenea propinqua vientianana Breuning, 1965

References

propinqua
Beetles described in 1897